Amets Txurruka Ansola (born 10 November 1982) is a Spanish former professional road bicycle racer, who rode professionally between 2006 and 2016 for the , ,  and  teams.

Career 
Born in Etxebarria in the Basque Country, Txurruka made his Tour de France debut in 2007, memorably participating (alongside Pierrick Fédrigo) in a breakaway during Stage 12 that was caught just  from the finish line. This effort earned him the red back numbers for most combative rider the next day. He was also indirectly benefited when Michael Rasmussen was withdrawn from the Tour; Txurruka was third in the young rider classification, behind Alberto Contador and Mauricio Soler. With Contador wearing the yellow jersey as leader of the general classification because of Rasmussen's withdrawal, and Soler wearing the polka dot jersey as leader of the mountains classification, Txurruka wore the white jersey that is given to the leader of the young rider classification.

He was also chosen as the most combative rider of whole Tour, being the third Spanish rider in a row (after Óscar Pereiro and David de la Fuente) to earn that award.

In the Tour of the Basque Country, Txurruka won both the mountains and sprint classification jerseys after being part of long breakaways for the first three stages. In August 2015  announced that they had signed Txurruka on a one-year deal for 2016.

Major results 

2005
 9th Clásica Memorial Txuma
2006
 5th GP Industria & Artigianato di Larciano
 8th Overall Vuelta a Asturias
 8th Giro d'Oro
 9th Overall Euskal Bizikleta
 9th Overall Clásica Internacional de Alcobendas
2007
 6th Overall Vuelta a La Rioja
 Tour de France
 Combativity award Stage 12 & Overall
2009
 6th Vuelta a La Rioja
 8th Overall Vuelta a Asturias
 10th Overall Tour de Luxembourg
2011
 7th Klasika Primavera
 8th Overall Vuelta a la Comunidad de Madrid
  Combativity award Stage 13 Vuelta a España
2012
 6th Overall Vuelta a Asturias
2013
 1st  Overall Vuelta a Asturias
1st Stage 1
 Tour of the Basque Country
1st  Mountains classification
1st  Sprints classification
 1st  Mountains classification, Vuelta a Burgos
 5th Vuelta a la Comunidad de Madrid
 9th Overall Vuelta a Castilla y León
2014
 1st  Overall Tour du Gévaudan Languedoc-Roussillon
 1st  Mountains classification, Tour des Fjords
 9th Klasika Primavera
 9th Coppa Sabatini
  Combativity award Stage 4 Vuelta a España
2015
 1st Stage 4 Tour of Norway
 2nd Overall Vuelta a Asturias
 3rd Prueba Villafranca de Ordizia
 4th Overall Tour de Beauce
1st Stage 2
 4th Overall Vuelta a la Comunidad de Madrid
 4th Philadelphia International Cycling Classic
 5th Overall Tour des Fjords
1st  Mountains classification
 5th Giro dell'Appennino
 7th GP Miguel Induráin
 10th Grand Prix La Marseillaise
 10th Klasika Primavera
 10th Circuito de Getxo
  Combativity award Stage 7 Vuelta a España

Grand Tour general classification results timeline

References

External links 
 
 
 
 
 

1982 births
Living people
Spanish male cyclists
Cyclists from the Basque Country (autonomous community)
Sportspeople from Biscay
People from Lea-Artibai